The Watchmaker is a 2011 Georgian crime film directed by Giorgi Maskharashvili.

Cast
 Levan Berikashvili
 Dato Gotsiridze (as Datuna Gotsiridze)
 Giorgi Maskharashvili
 Giorgi Megrelishvili
 Giorgi Nakashidze
 Giorgi Tabidze
 Nino Tsotsoria

References

External links
 

2011 films
2011 crime films
Drama films from Georgia (country)
2010s Georgian-language films